The Joseph R. Brown State Wayside Rest is a National Scenic Byway Wayside Rest area. It is located on Renville County Highway 15, south of Sacred Heart, Minnesota, United States.

The Wayside Rest displays the granite ruins of Joseph R. Brown's home from 1862. Brown, his mixed-blood wife and twelve children lived in this home, which was a center of hospitality along the Minnesota River Valley. The three-story home was then considered a mansion compared to typical pioneer homes. It was destroyed during the Dakota War of 1862 on August 19, 1862. His family was spared because of his wife's Native American heritage.

Brown was a politician, inventor, publisher, and Indian Agent.

References

External links

Joseph R. Brown State Wayside Rest, Minnesota
Joseph R. Brown Memorial

Dakota War of 1862
Brown House Ruins
Minnesota River
State parks of Minnesota
Protected areas of Renville County, Minnesota
Ruins in the United States
Houses in Renville County, Minnesota
National Register of Historic Places in Renville County, Minnesota